The Javan black-capped babbler (Pellorneum capistratum) is a species of bird in the family Pellorneidae.
It is endemic to the island of Java in Indonesia. The Malayan black-capped babbler (P. nigrocapitatum) and the Bornean black-capped babbler (P. capistratoides) were both formerly considered conspecific, but were split from it in 2021.
Its natural habitat is subtropical or tropical moist lowland forest.

References

Collar, N. J. & Robson, C. 2007. Family Timaliidae (Babblers)  pp. 70 – 291 in; del Hoyo, J., Elliott, A. & Christie, D.A. eds. Handbook of the Birds of the World, Vol. 12. Picathartes to Tits and Chickadees. Lynx Edicions, Barcelona.

Javan black-capped babbler
Javan black-capped babbler
Taxonomy articles created by Polbot
Birds of Java
Endemic fauna of Java
Javan black-capped babbler